Human-elephant conflict (HEC) is a large threat in certain rural areas of Sri Lanka. People and elephants, very often lose their lives and properties in this conflict. Approximately 250 elephants and 80 people die in Sri Lanka each year. Most elephant calves are killed by the hunting method known as "Hakka Pattas" (හක්කා පටාස්/ஹக்கா படாஸ்) The Department of Wildlife Conservation estimated that there are currently 7,000 elephants in the country. According to the Department of Wildlife Conservation official records showed that more than 361 elephants were killed in 2019. Sri Lanka has surpassed highest number of elephant kills than any other county in the world.

Sri Lankan elephant 

Sri Lankan elephant (Elephas maximus maximus) is a subspecies of Asian Elephant, and native to Sri Lanka. Sri Lankan elephant has been listed as endangered species since 1986. Sri Lankan elephant is smaller than African Elephant and larger than the average Asian elephant. Local elephant can grow to be 2 to 3.5 meters in height and 4 to 6 metres in length. It is tallest at the arch of the back. It weighs between 3,000 and 5,000 kilograms. Only the males have tusks and these are smaller than those of the African elephants.

Background 
Fragmentation and loss of the natural habitat of elephants are considered to be the main causes of HEC in Sri Lanka. DWC observes that HEC is a serious problem particularly in unprotected areas of the North-western and Mahaweli regions in the country. Several studies have poaching has helped reduce elephant populations by up 75 percent over the last century. But this is largely due to human impacts, the increased utilization of the natural habitats of elephants of agricultural development schemes and the expansion of human settlements into elephant habitat.

Deforestation 

Deforestation is a major problem in Sri Lanka. Current forest coverage has decreased to 16%. Since the 1920s, the forest cover in Sri Lanka has declined from 70 percent to about less than 20 percent at present. Sri Lanka total Forest coverage felled 10% between 2000-2019. Most elephants lived in dry zone areas of the country.

Human elephant conflict death toll

Managed elephant reserve 
In 2009, authorities rolled out a plan to create an elephant reserve connecting three national parks in southern Sri Lanka. The area of land marked for this purpose comprises 23,746 hectares, excluding the area of land comprising 866 hectares marked for the Mattala Airport. Southern elephant reserve project postponed due to numerous projects such as Mattala airport, Hambantota harbour and Hambantota cricket stadium. Past 10 years 15,000 acres of forest lands were cleared to build the commercial purpose.

See also 
 Natural forests in Sri Lanka
 Agriculture in Sri Lanka
 Chena cultivation

References

External links 
 Livelihood Insurance from Elephants, a literature review

Elephants in Sri Lanka
Agriculture in Sri Lanka
Deforestation by region